Wild Lake is a lake near Idrija in western Slovenia and a karst spring of the Vauclusian type. The discharge occasionally surpasses . However, when the water level is low, there is no outflow from the lake. In 1967, the lake was protected as a natural monument. In 1972, it was arranged to be the first Slovenian natural museum.

References

External links
 Wild Lake - Museum in Nature. Idrija Tourism.
 Divje jezero. Virtual panoramas. Slovenia Landmarks. Boštjan Burger.

Lakes of the Slovene Littoral
Caves of the Slovene Littoral
Karst caves
Karst springs
Karst formations of Slovenia
Springs of Slovenia
Municipality of Idrija
L
Wetlands in the Slovene Littoral